Heather Lawless is an American actress, comedian, and voice actress.

Early life
Lawless was born in Georgia, and raised in the Great Smoky Mountains of North Carolina. She graduated from the University of Georgia.

Career
She began her career as a comedian, performing stand-up comedy at The Comedy Store in Los Angeles, and has performed on tour with Flight of The Conchords, Zach Galifianakis, David Cross, and The Comedians of Comedy. She was featured on the Comedy Central series Premium Blend and on the Comedy Central DVD/CD set Invite Them Up.

She has performed lead roles in The Heart, She Holler, The Campaign, Be Kind Rewind, and the Adult Swim animated series Xavier: Renegade Angel. She also portrays Permanently Preggy Peggy on MTV's Wonder Showzen, Dottie on Stone Quackers, and Jenna Bilzerian on the Netflix original series Big Mouth playing the mother of Jay.

Other roles have included Comedy Central's Speed Freaks, AMC's Life Coach with Cheri Oteri, That Crook'd 'Sipp, and Freaknik: The Musical.

Heather is a recurring cast member in At Home with Amy Sedaris, which started airing in October 2017.

Personal life
Lawless has one son.

Filmography

Film

Television

References

External links

Living people
American television actresses
American voice actresses
Actresses from Georgia (U.S. state)
Year of birth missing (living people)
American film actresses
American women comedians
21st-century American women